The Wedderburn meteorite is an iron meteorite discovered in 1951 near the town of Wedderburn in the state of Victoria, Australia.

In 2019 it was announced that edscottite, a mineral previously not found in nature, had been identified in a sample of the Wedderburn meteorite. It is believed the mineral was created in the core of another planet.

References

Meteorites found in Australia
 Iron meteorites